Tubul may refer to:

 Tubul, a fishing village in Chile
 Tubul River
 Tubul Formation a geological formation in Chile
 Tubul, one of the gigantic elephants that support the Discworld on their backs